Parablennius cyclops is a species of combtooth blenny found in the western Indian ocean, in the Red Sea.

References

cyclops
Fish described in 1830
Fish of the Red Sea